Tyrictaca is a genus of moths in the family Sesiidae.

Species
Tyrictaca apicalis Walker, 1862

References

Sesiidae